The William & Mary Law School, formally known as the Marshall-Wythe School of Law, is the law school of the College of William & Mary, a public research university in Williamsburg, Virginia. It is the oldest extant law school in the United States, having been founded in 1779 at the urging of alumnus Thomas Jefferson. It has an enrollment of 645 full-time students (in 2018–19) seeking a Juris Doctor (J.D.) or a Master of Laws (LL.M.) in the American Legal System, a two or three semester program for lawyers trained outside the United States.

History
William & Mary Law School was founded in 1779 at the impetus of Virginia Governor Thomas Jefferson, an alumnus of the university, during the reorganization of the originally royal institution, transforming the college of William and Mary into the first university in the United States.  At Jefferson's urging, the governing board of visitors of William & Mary established a chair of law and appointed George Wythe, a signer of the Declaration of Independence, delegate to the Philadelphia Convention, and Justice of the Supreme Court of Virginia, its first holder. (In the English-speaking world, older law professorships include the chair at Oxford University, first held by William Blackstone, the chair at Edinburgh University's School of Law (1709), and the Regius Chair of Law at Glasgow University). 

Before filling the chair of law at William & Mary, Wythe tutored numerous students in the subject, including Thomas Jefferson and James Monroe. John Marshall, who became Chief Justice of the United States in 1801, received his only formal legal education when he attended Wythe's lectures at William & Mary in 1780. St. George Tucker, who succeeded Wythe as Professor of Law and edited the seminal early American edition of Blackstone's Commentaries, also was one of Wythe's students.

The growth of the school was halted abruptly by the beginning of the American Civil War. The start of military campaigns on the Virginia Peninsula compelled William & Mary to close its doors. It would be another sixty years before the historical priority in law could be revived in a modern program that is now nearly ninety years old.

After William & Mary Law School was reopened early in the twentieth century (1921), it was moved around the main campus of the university to several different buildings in succession. In 1980, the school was moved to its current location on the outskirts of Colonial Williamsburg, a short distance from the main campus. The building has been renovated several times since 1980, with the addition of a new wing of classrooms and renovation of older classrooms in 2000, the opening of the Henry C. Wolf Law Library, the construction of a new admission suite, and the addition of the James A. and Robin L. Hixon Center for Experiential Learning and Leadership (dedicated in 2017).

A. Benjamin Spencer, a nationally renowned civil procedure and federal courts expert and former professor of law at the University of Virginia, is the current dean and Chancellor Professor at William & Mary Law School. Named on July 1, 2020, he is William & Mary's first African-American dean of any school at the university, including the law school. W. Taylor Reveley III, formerly managing partner of the law firm of Hunton & Williams, is a former dean of the law school. He served as the 27th president of William & Mary from September 5, 2008, to June 30, 2018, after serving as interim president since February 2008.  Davison M. Douglas served as dean from July 2009 through June 30, 2020. The former chancellor of William & Mary, Sandra Day O'Connor, delivered commencement remarks to the graduating class of the school in 2006, 2008 and 2010.

Cost of attendance
Tuition at William & Mary for the 2021–22 academic year is $30,600 for Virginia residents and $44,600 for non-residents. Approximately 97% of students received financial aid (2020). Law School Transparency estimated debt-financed cost of attendance for three years, based on data from the 2018–2019 academic year, is $197,520 for residents; the estimated cost for non-residents is $229,557.

Employment
According to William & Mary's official 2019 ABA-required disclosures, 95% of the Class of 2019 obtained full-time, long-term, JD-required or JD-advantaged, non-school funded employment nine months after graduation. William & Mary's Law School Transparency under-employment score is 10%, indicating the percentage of the Class of 2018 unemployed, pursuing an additional degree, or working in a non-professional, short-term, or part-time job nine months after graduation, with 0%  of the class in school-funded jobs.

In 2019, William & Mary Law School came in 11th among all U.S. law schools in percentage of graduates that secured full-time, long-term federal judicial clerkships, often seen as the most prestigious clerkships law graduates can obtain.

Ranking 
W&M Law was ranked 24th on the Above the Law ranking in 2019.
U.S. News ranked W&M Law as tied for the 30th place in their latest 2023 rankings of the nation's law schools. For the Class of 2025 (enrolled as of October 1, 2022), the median undergraduate GPA was 3.75 and the median LSAT score was 165.

Programs
 William & Mary Law School offers institutes and programs such as the Center for Racial & Social Justice, the Coastal Policy Center, the Center for Comparative Legal Studies and Post-Conflict Peacebuilding, the Center for Legal and Court Technology, the Center for the Study of Law and Markets, the Dunn Civil Liberties Project, the Election Law Program, the Human Security Law Center, the Institute of Bill of Rights Law, and the Property Rights Project.
 The annual Supreme Court Preview of the Institute of Bill of Rights Law brings journalists and academics together each fall for an analysis of key cases on the Court's docket for the new term. 
 William & Mary Law School has several Clinics for students to work under the supervision of attorneys, ranging in areas of practice. The Clinics offered include the Appellate and Supreme Court Clinic, Domestic Violence Clinic, Elder Law and Disability Clinic, Federal Tax Clinic, Immigration Clinic, Innocence Project Clinic, Lewis J. Puller Veterans' Benefits Clinic, and Special Education Advocacy Clinic. The Lewis B. Puller, Jr. Veteran's Benefits Clinic provides students (under the supervision of staff attorneys) with the opportunity to ensure that veterans receive the benefits which they are entitled to as a matter of law and service.
 Journals include the William & Mary Law Review, the Bill of Rights Journal, William & Mary Environmental Law and Policy Review, William & Mary Journal of Race, Gender, and Social Justice, and Business Law Review.
 The school's McGlothlin Courtroom is home to the Center for Legal and Court Technology, a joint program of the School and the National Center for State Courts. The mission of the project is to use technology to improve the administration of justice and the legal systems of the world.
 Created in 2005 as a joint venture of the National Center for State Courts and the Law School, the Election Law Program was intended to provide practical assistance to state court judges in the United States who are called upon to resolve difficult election law disputes.  It has since been expanded to include a student Election Law Society. 
 The George Wythe Society of Citizen Lawyers is a civic leadership program, formed in the fall of 2005, to recognize and encourage community service and civic participation by members of the student body.
 The Human Rights and National Security Law Program focuses on the interplay between national defense and the protection of civil rights. The Program's Distinguished Lecture Series and co-sponsored symposia bring experts to campus each semester to foster discussion and debate about on-going and emerging issues.
 The Center for the Study of Law and Markets seeks to advance the understanding of the role of legal institutions in promoting well-functioning markets in a free society.
 The Center for Comparative Legal Studies and Post-Conflict Peacebuilding bridges the gap between resources available at academic institutions and the need for them in the field by rule of law actors engaged in post-conflict reconstruction efforts. The Center serves as a focal point for the law school's international and comparative legal and policy research and programming and sponsors summer international internships in developing and post-conflict countries around the world.
 The Institute of Bill of Rights Law engages in study of the Bill of Rights and sponsors a variety of lectures, conferences, and publications to examine Constitutional issues.
 The William & Mary Property Rights Project encourages scholarly study of the role that property rights play in society.  The Project's annual Brigham-Kanner Property Rights Conference explores recent developments in areas such as takings litigation and takings law.

Notable alumni
 Michele Bachmann (LL.M., 1988), U.S. House of Representatives, Minnesota (2007–2014)
 Dennis L. Beck (William & Mary 1969, Law 1972), magistrate judge of the United States District Court for the Eastern District of California (1990–2012)
 John L. Brownlee (Law 1994), former U.S. Attorney for the Western District of Virginia
 Ronald L. Buckwalter (Law 1962), judge of the United States District Court for the Eastern District of Pennsylvania (1990–2003)
 William H. Cabell (Law 1793), received first baccalaureate in law granted in America, governor of Virginia (1805–1808), justice of the Supreme Court of Virginia (1811–1851)
 Eric Cantor (Law 1988), U.S. House of Representatives, Virginia (2001–2014); House Majority Leader of 112th Congress, 2011
 Glen E. Conrad (Law 1974), judge of the United States District Court for the Western District of Virginia (2003–2017), chief judge (2010–2017)
 Clifton L. Corker (Law 1993), Judge of the United States District Court for the Eastern District of Tennessee
 Thomas Cullen (Law 2004), Judge of the United States District Court for the Western District of Virginia, former United States Attorney for the Western District of Virginia
 Ted Dalton (Law 1926), judge of the United States District Court for the Western District of Virginia (1959–1976), chief judge (1960–1971)
 Powhatan Ellis (Law 1814), United States Senator from Mississippi; Judge of the United States District Court for the District of Mississippi
 Lizzie Fletcher (Law 2006), U.S. House of Representatives, Texas (2019–present)
 Matt Gaetz (Law 2007), U.S. House of Representatives, Florida (2017–present)
 Gurbir Grewal (Law 1999), Attorney General of New Jersey
 D. Arthur Kelsey (Law 1985), justice, Supreme Court of Virginia
 Jerry W. Kilgore (Law 1986), Attorney General of Virginia (2001–2005)
 Larry W. Lockwood, Jr. (Law 1995), Personal injury Attorney.
 James Murray Mason (Law 1820), member of the U.S. House of Representatives (1837–1839); United States Senator from Virginia (1847–1861)
 John Marshall, 4th Chief Justice of the United States
 Haldane Robert Mayer (Law 1971), judge of the U.S. Court of Appeals for the Federal Circuit (1987–present; chief judge of the Federal Circuit, 1997–2004)
 Tommy Miller (Law 1973), magistrate judge of the United States District Court for the Eastern District of Virginia (1987; announced his retirement in 2014)
 Doug Miller (Law 1995), magistrate judge of the United States District Court for the Eastern District of Virginia (2009–present   ) 
 LeRoy Francis Millette, Jr. (William & Mary 1971, Law 1974), justice Supreme Court of Virginia (2009–present )
Jason Miyares (Law 2005), Attorney General of Virginia.
 Lewis Burwell Puller, Jr. (William & Mary 1967, Law 1974), Vietnam veteran (Lt., USMC (Silver Star, two Purple Hearts, the Navy Commendation Medal and the Vietnam Cross of Gallantry) and Pulitzer Prize winning author.  The William & Mary Law School's Veteran's Benefit Clinic is named after him.
Steve Salbu (JD), dean emeritus of the Scheller College of Business at the Georgia Institute of Technology (2006–2014).
 Robert E. Scott (Law 1968), law professor at Columbia Law School, dean of University of Virginia Law School (1991–2001), and fellow of the American Academy of Arts and Sciences.
 Rebecca Beach Smith, (William & Mary 1971, Law 1979), Chief District Judge of the United States District Court for the Eastern District of Virginia (2011–2018) 
 Henry St. George Tucker (William & Mary 1798, Law 1801), professor of law at William & Mary (1801–1804), justice of the Supreme Court of Virginia (1824–1831), remembered for editing the American edition of Blackstone's Commentaries.
 Jessica Aber, (Law 2006), U.S. Attorney for Eastern District of Virginia.
Jennifer Wexton, (Law 1995), U.S. House of Representatives, Virginia (2019–present)
Susan Davis Wigenton, (Law 1987), District Judge, United States District Court for the District of New Jersey, (2006–present)
 Henry C. Wolf (William & Mary 1964, Law 1966), former chief financial officer and vice chairman of Norfolk Southern Corporation, former William & Mary rector, benefactor of the Henry C. Wolf Law Library at the Law School.

Notable faculty members (past and present)
 William W. Van Alstyne
 Angela M. Banks
 Lan Cao
 Davison M. Douglas
 Mitchell Reiss
 W. Taylor Reveley III
 William Spong Jr.
 St. George Tucker
 George Wythe

Law journals
 William & Mary Law Review
 William & Mary Bill of Rights Journal
 William & Mary Environmental Law and Policy Review
 William & Mary Journal of Race, Gender, and Social Justice (previously the William & Mary Journal of Women and the Law)
 William & Mary Business Law Review

See also
 I Am the College of William and Mary

References

Notes

External links
 William and Mary Law School

Law schools in Virginia
Law
Educational institutions established in 1779
1779 establishments in Virginia